Todd Stoll is an American jazz trumpeter and Vice President of Education at Jazz at Lincoln Center.

Biography
Todd Stoll was raised in Springfield, Ohio, where he studied trumpet at the University of Cincinnati's Conservatory of Music, and later came under the tutelage of Vaughn Wiester. Initially focusing on performing, Stoll went on the road performing after graduation. In the early 90s, Stoll became a band director in the Columbus, Ohio area, where he founded the Columbus Youth Jazz Orchestra in 1991 to give young people the chance to cultivate a love of jazz through performance. He directed it for 20 years. Under his direction, the Orchestra released 6 CDs.

A longtime friend and colleague of trumpeter Wynton Marsalis, Stoll joined Jazz at Lincoln Center's Education Department in 2011, becoming Vice President of Education. Under his leadership, the education department has expanded its community outreach through band performances in New York City with the Jazz for Young People on Tour program and through educational outreach led by members of the Jazz at Lincoln Center Orchestra while the orchestra is on tour. Stoll also oversaw the creation and launch of the Jazz Academy, an online education site featuring a freely accessible video library of jazz lessons taught by musicians including Eric Reed, Helen Sung, Gary Bartz, and Azar Lawrence.

Stoll is an avid fan of Duke Ellington. He calls him "a universal humanist".

Youth jazz bands 
The Columbus Youth Jazz Orchestra is a highly competitive jazz band geared primarily towards very talented high school musicians in the central Ohio area. In addition to the Youth Jazz Orchestra, Stoll also created and oversaw the Columbus Youth Jazz Studio Ensemble and the Columbus Youth Jazz Workshop. The Studio Ensemble and Workshop provided a pipeline to the Orchestra, training young musicians new to jazz with other students already playing in the genre. Through these three bands, Stoll impacted the lives of hundreds of young people in central Ohio. Stoll's passion for jazz attracted talented student musicians from the entire region, even those who weren't initially interested in jazz. Stoll's signature phrase during rehearsals was "Swing, Goddammit!"

References

1963 births
Living people
American jazz trumpeters
American male trumpeters
21st-century trumpeters
21st-century American male musicians
American male jazz musicians